Pool of London is a 1951 British noir crime film directed by Basil Dearden. It stars Bonar Colleano, Earl Cameron and Susan Shaw.

Plot
The character-driven story of Pool of London centres around the crew of the merchant ship Dunbar, which docks in the Pool of London. The crew members are given shore leave, with some practising petty smuggling and other various dodges. Set in post-war London, the film is of note for portraying the first interracial relationship in a British film.

Black crew member Johnny (Earl Cameron), an all-round nice guy, meets a pretty blonde, Pat (Susan Shaw), who offers to show him the sights of London. In a visually-rich montage, they visit the National Maritime Museum and the Greenwich Observatory. Also shown briefly are views from the dome of St Paul's Cathedral, and some of the bombed areas around the cathedral before the rebuilding of Paternoster Square.

Another seaman, Dan (Bonar Colleano), inadvertently becomes involved with a jewel robbery in which a night watchman is murdered.

Main cast

 Bonar Colleano as Dan MacDonald 
 Earl Cameron as Johnny Lambert 
 Susan Shaw as Pat 
 Renée Asherson as Sally 
 Moira Lister as Maisie 
 Max Adrian as Charlie Vernon 
 Joan Dowling as Pamela 
 James Robertson Justice as Engine Room Officer Trotter 
 Michael Golden as Customs Officer Andrews 
 John Longden as Detective Inspector Williams
 Alfie Bass as Alf
 Christopher Hewett as Mike 
 Leslie Phillips as Harry
 Ian Bannen as Garage attendant
 George Benson as George
 Beckett Bould as The Watchman
 Sam Kydd as 2nd Engineer
 Victor Maddern as First Tram Conductor
 Laurence Naismith as Commissionaire
 Campbell Singer as Station Sergeant

Release
Pool of London premiered at the Odeon Leicester Square in London on 22 February 1951.

Critical reception
In The New York Times, Bosley Crowther wrote, "there is excitement and suspense in the gritty and grimy melodramatics," and concluded that the film, "though not distinguished, is entertaining and has the flavor of a great shipping port."

References

External links
 
 
 

1951 films
1951 crime drama films
British crime drama films
Ealing Studios films
Films directed by Basil Dearden
Films produced by Michael Balcon
Films scored by John Addison
Films set in London
Films with screenplays by Jack Whittingham
British black-and-white films
1950s English-language films
1950s British films